Bordeaux Segalen University (originally called University of Victor Segalen Bordeaux II) was one of four universities in Bordeaux (together with Bordeaux 1, Michel de Montaigne Bordeaux 3 and Montesquieu Bordeaux IV) and five in Aquitaine. In 2014, it merged with Bordeaux 1 and Bordeaux 4 to form University of Bordeaux.

Bordeaux Segalen was specialized in Life and Health Sciences and Human and Social Sciences. 

It consisted of three UFRs of medicine, one UFR of pharmacy, one of odontology, one of human and social sciences (psychology, sociology, ethnology, educational sciences, cognitive sciences), one of mathematics applied to human and life sciences, one of life sciences (human biology, biology of extreme environments, neurosciences), one of oenology, one of sports sciences, a higher school of biotechnology (ESTBB) and three institutes, one of public health (ISPED), one for hydrotherapy (in Dax), and one for cognitics (cognitive engineering - IdC, now ENSC)

Bordeaux Segalen contained the UFR d'Oenologie, a reputed oenological institute founded in 1880 by Ulysse Gayon, the same year of foundation as the similar faculty of University of California at Davis.

Since 2003, a team led by Dominique Martin of the Bordeaux University Hospital, has been rehearsing for the first human operation in zero gravity, using Zero-G aircraft. The operation is part of a project to develop surgical robots in space that are guided via satellite by Earth-based doctors. The project is developed with backing from the European Space Agency (ESA).

Presidency
Succession of presidents:
 Prof. Henri Bricaud, elected on December 21, 1970
 Pr Jacques Latrille, elected on December 19, 1975
 Pr Jean Tavernier, elected October 19, 1980, re-elected February 15, 1982
 Pr Dominique Ducassou, elected on December 17, 1987
 Pr Jacques Beylot, elected on November 17, 1992
 Pr Josy Reiffers, elected on November 17, 1997
 Pr Bernard Bégaud, elected on September 30, 2002
 Pr Manuel Tunon de Lara, was elected on January 29, 2008.

Points of interest
Jardin botanique de Talence

See also
University of Bordeaux
List of public universities in France by academy
Victor Segalen

References

External links

University of Bordeaux
2
1968 establishments in France
Bordeaux 2